The 2017 TCR International Series was the third and the last season of the TCR International Series.

Stefano Comini entered the season as defending double champion, but finished only third in the standings with 30 points behind the new champion Jean-Karl Vernay, who won the title with a race to spare in the Dubai round, and Attila Tassi. Comini and Tassi were separated by only one point.

In the teams' standings Hungarian team M1RA managed to secure the title in Dubai, beating the previous champions Craft-Bamboo Racing by 62 points.

Teams and drivers

Team and driver changes 
Stefano Comini left Leopard Racing to join the newly entered Comtoyou Racing with Audi RS3 LMS TCR.  Frédéric Vervisch joined the team in the second Audi from Spa onwards, while for the final two rounds of the season they've entered a third entry for TCR Benelux regular Denis Dupont who was behind the wheel of SEAT León TCR.

Leopard Racing retained Jean-Karl Vernay and at Spa they've entered a second car for Robert Huff. Huff only entered rounds which did not clashed with his commitments in the World Touring Car Championship. At Monza he was replaced by Jaap van Lagen and in Dubai by Gordon Shedden. Van Lagen entered in Oschersleben in a third car. The team also supported Maxime Potty who entered at Spa under the Michaël Mazurin Sport banner.

Craft-Bamboo Racing retained Pepe Oriola and James Nash, but Sergey Afanasyev was replaced by Hugo Valente. Valente left the team after Monza and his seat was taken by Daniel Lloyd.

WestCoast Racing switched from Civic Type R TCR (FK2) to Volkswagen Golf GTI TCR. As a result, the team ended their association with Sportspromotion – the operation responsible for WestCoast Racing's entry in the series. The team retained Gianni Morbidelli while Giacomo Altoè was entered in the second car. Altoè would leave the team after Oschersleben and he was replaced by the TCR Asia Series regular Kantadhee Kusiri at Buriram, Rafaël Galiana at Zhejiang and Benjamin Leuchter at Dubai.

The newly formed team of M1RA entered the series entering two Civic Type R TCR (FK2) cars for the veteran Roberto Colciago and Attila Tassi. Norbert Michelisz, who is also co-owner of the team, entered at Hungaroring in a third Civic and in Buriram as stand-in for Colciago, who was recovering from injuries sustained during the Oschersleben round. Giacomo Altoè entered the team in Buriram in the team's third entry and double ADAC TCR Germany champion Josh Files entered in Dubai.

TCR Benelux team DG Sport Compétition entered the series with two Opel Astra TCR cars for TCR Trophy Europe winner Pierre-Yves Corthals and Maťo Homola. Corthals was later replaced by Grégoire Demoustier who later left the team after Oschersleben. With the exception of Zhejiang, where the team entered a single car for Homola, the team's second entry was driven by Munkong Sathienthirakul in Buriram and by 2017 TCR Trophy Europe winner Aurélien Comte in Dubai.

Davit Kajaia left Liqui Moly Team Engstler to form GE Force in partnership with Romeo Ferraris who provided the team with two Alfa Romeo Giulietta TCR cars. Dušan Borković joined the team in the second car. The team also entered a third car for Rustavi International Motorpark owner Shota Abkhazava in Rustavi and for Michela Cerruti in Bahrain.

Duncan Ende made his series début driving for his own team Icarus Motorsports in a SEAT León TCR.

Zengő Motorsport returned to the series after missing out the previous season. The team was supposed to enter Cee'd TCR for Ferenc Ficza, but due to delays in delivery Ficza was rotating between Zengõ Motorsport and Zele Racing driving SEAT León TCR. In Hungaroring the Cee'd TCR made its debut appearance with Ficza behind the wheel, but after Oschersleben the team withdrew from the season due to reliability issues.

Stian Paulsen and Jens Reno Møller entered the series from Spa to Oschersleben rider for their own teams - Stian Paulsen Racing and Reno Racing. The European TCR rounds counted as qualification for the 2017 TCR Trophy Europe, but neither of them entered the event.

After fielding two one-off entries for their TCR Benelux drivers Tom Coronel and Benjamin Lessennes at Spa, Boutsen Ginion Racing entered a single Honda Civic Type R TCR for Aurélien Panis from Oschersleben onwards.

Liqui Moly Team Engstler left the series to concentrate on their campaigns in TCR Asia Series and ADAC TCR Germany Touring Car Championship. The team entered Luca Engstler in Oschesleben under the Junior Team Engstler banner.

BRC Racing Team made its début in the series for the final two rounds of the season fielding two Hyundai i30 N TCR cars for veteran riders Gabriele Tarquini and Alain Menu The team received support from Hyundai Motorsport. However, as the i30 N TCR was given temporary homologation neither the team, nor its drivers were eligible to score points.

B3 Racing folded after the end of the 2016 season due to financial difficulties. Many of the team's personnel went on to form M1RA.

Target Competition also left the series after 2016 to concentrate on their efforts in ADAC TCR Germany.

Calendar 
The 2017 provisional schedule was announced on 28 November 2016, with ten events scheduled.

Calendar changes 
The rounds held at Autodromo do Estoril, Autodromo Enzo e Dino Ferrari, Sochi Autodrom, Marina Bay Street Circuit, Sepang International Circuit and Guia Circuit were discontinued.

The series made their debut in Georgia at the Rustavi International Motorpark which opened the season.

The provisional calendar featured a round at the Circuit de Monaco supporting the Monaco Grand Prix, but was removed as it wasn't approved by the Monegasque ASN as they had never entered negotiations to stage the race. It was replaced by Autodromo Nazionale di Monza in Italy as supporting series to the European Le Mans Series.

With the release of the TCR China Touring Car Championship the calendar slot for October, which was left vacant, was given to the Zhejiang International Circuit. In the previous two seasons the series visited Shanghai International Circuit.

The round in Hungaroring was originally scheduled on 1–2 July, but for logistics reasons it was pulled back two weeks earlier than planned. The change also meant that the series would support the Hungarian round of the Deutsche Tourenwagen Masters.

The season finale which was supposed to be held on Yas Marina Circuit supporting the Abu Dhabi Grand Prix was moved to Dubai Autodrome with the new date being a week earlier.

Results

Footnotes

Fan Award
At the end of every weekend, a panel consisting of the International Series' Promoter and the promotional and media team name three candidates who stood out during the event for any particular reason.

Championship standings

Drivers' championship

† – Drivers did not finish the race, but were classified as they completed over 75% of the race distance.

Teams' Championship 

† – Drivers did not finish the race, but were classified as they completed over 75% of the race distance.

Model of the year

† – Drivers did not finish the race, but were classified as they completed over 75% of the race distance.

References

External links
 

 
2017
International Series